State Route 256 (SR 256) is a north-south secondary state highway located in northern Middle Tennessee. Except for its southern terminus on US 41A, the route is located almost entirely In western Robertson County.

Route description 
SR 256’s southern terminus is at a junction with US 41A (SR 112) northwest of Pleasant View, which really constitutes Cheatham County’s northern boundary with Robertson County in that area. SR 256 crosses the I-24 corridor at that route’s Exit 19 interchange. The secondary route ends in Adams, at a junction with SR 76.

Major intersections

References 
 

256
256
256